Silene involucrata is a species of flowering plant belonging to the family Caryophyllaceae.

It is native to Subarctic.

Synonym:
 Silene furcata Raf.

References

involucrata